KDBI may refer to:

 KDBI (AM), a radio station (730 AM) licensed to serve Boise, Idaho, United States
 KDBI-FM, a radio station (106.3 FM) licensed to serve Homedale, Idaho